Xue Chen (born 18 February 1989 in Fuzhou, Fujian) is a Chinese beach volleyball player, measuring  in height. Her hometown is Fuzhou, but she trains in Sanya, Hainan. She has also trained in California under coach Dane Selznick.  She competed at the 2020 Olympics with X. Wang in Tokyo held in 2021.

Career

Xue began playing basketball as a child, but disliked the physical contact of that sport. She then played indoor volleyball from the age of 10 to 13 before settling into beach volleyball. She began training for her sports career in 2000 at the Fuzhou Sports Training School. In 2002, she attended the Athletic Sports College of Fuzhou and became a member of the Chinese national beach volleyball team. Xue then made her Swatch-FIVB World Tour debut in 2005, playing in two events with You Wenhui and winning the FIVB Top Rookie award for 2006.

Early 2006 Xue became the youngest player to ever win a major event, when on 28 May 2006 the 17-year-old won the $400,000 China Shanghai Jinshan Open.

Later in 2006, Xue and Zhang Xi won the gold medal in the women's team competition at the 2006 Asian Games. The pair also won the bronze medal in women's beach volleyball at the 2008 Summer Olympics.

The pair had great success in 2010, which included winning the Grand Slam in Moscow, Russia, for the second time. They also achieved an extraordinary gold-medal win on the FIVB World Tour Women's Final in Åland, Finland, by snapping the record gold-medal winning-streak of Brazil's França–Silva duo on 21 August 2010. In 2009 they won the gold medal at the Asian Beach Volleyball Championships in Haikou, China, and retained the title in 2010. They then went on to win gold at the Sanya Open in Hainan, the Guangzhou Asian Games, and the Asian Beach Games. The team of Xue and Zhang were ranked 4th overall on the 2010 FIVB Beach Volleyball World Rankings and finished the season ranked first in the FIVB World Rankings.

Xue and Zhang represented China in the 2012 London Olympics and ended 4th in the female beach volleyball competition. She competed at the 2020 Olympics with X. Wang in Tokyo held in 2021.

Playing partners
 Zhang Xi 2010–present
 Zhang Ying 2008–2009
 Zhang Xi 2006–2008
 Yan Ni 2003–2006
 Xia Xinyi 2017–present
 Ma Yuanyuan 2017–Present
 X. Wang (at 2020 Olympics in Tokyo held in 2021)

See also
 China at the 2012 Summer Olympics#Volleyball
 Beach volleyball at the 2012 Summer Olympics – Women's tournament

References

External links
 
 
 
 

1989 births
Living people
Chinese female beach volleyball players
Olympic beach volleyball players of China
Olympic medalists in beach volleyball
Olympic bronze medalists for China
Asian Games medalists in beach volleyball
Asian Games gold medalists for China
Medalists at the 2006 Asian Games
Medalists at the 2010 Asian Games
Medalists at the 2008 Summer Olympics
Beach volleyball players at the 2006 Asian Games
Beach volleyball players at the 2008 Summer Olympics
Beach volleyball players at the 2010 Asian Games
Beach volleyball players at the 2012 Summer Olympics
Sportspeople from Fuzhou
Volleyball players from Fujian
Beach volleyball players at the 2020 Summer Olympics
21st-century Chinese women